Jenő Bakos (5 May 1929 – 5 February 1959) was a Hungarian middle-distance runner. He competed in the men's 800 metres at the 1952 Summer Olympics.

References

1929 births
1959 deaths
Athletes (track and field) at the 1952 Summer Olympics
Hungarian male middle-distance runners
Olympic athletes of Hungary
Place of birth missing